Private Life (translit. Chastnaya zhizn) is a 1982 Soviet drama film directed by Yuli Raizman. It was nominated for the Academy Award for Best Foreign Language Film in 1982.

Plot 
When two film companies merge, the former director of one of them must retire. Unexpectedly, he is now faced with a lack of understanding from his wife and children. Loneliness, self-pity and jealousy force him to critically examine his life for the first time.

Cast
 Mikhail Ulyanov as Sergei Nikitich Abrikosov
 Iya Savvina as Natalia Ilinichna
 Irina Gubanova as Nelli Petpovna
 Tatyana Dogileva as Vika
 Aleksei Blokhin as Igor
 Elena Sanayeva as Marina
 Liliya Gritsenko as Marya Andreevna
 Yevgeni Lazarev as Viktor Sergeyevich Petelin

See also
 List of submissions to the 55th Academy Awards for Best Foreign Language Film
 List of Soviet submissions for the Academy Award for Best Foreign Language Film

References

External links

1982 films
1982 drama films
1980s Russian-language films
Mosfilm films
Films directed by Yuli Raizman
Soviet drama films